Fabio Fornari (died 20 February 1596) was a Roman Catholic prelate who served as Bishop of Nardò (1583–1596).

Biography
On 9 March 1583, Fabio Fornari was appointed during the papacy of Pope Gregory XIII as Bishop of Nardò. He served as Bishop of Nardò until his death on 20 February 1596.

See also
Catholic Church in Italy

References

External links and additional sources
 (for Chronology of Bishops) 
(for Chronology of Bishops) 

16th-century Italian Roman Catholic bishops
1596 deaths
Bishops appointed by Pope Gregory XIII